Arzaneh may refer to:
 Arzaneh, East Azerbaijan
 Arzaneh, Bakharz, Razavi Khorasan Province
 Arzaneh, Khvaf, Razavi Khorasan Province

See also
 Arzaneh Bal